Mungaoli railway station is a railway station in Ashoknagar district, Madhya Pradesh. Its code is MNV. It serves Mungaoli town. The station consists of two platforms. It lacks many facilities including water and sanitation. Passenger and Express trains halt here.

References

Railway stations in Ashoknagar district
Bhopal railway division